Kume may refer to:

People with the surname
, Japanese lawyer
Hiroshi Kume (born 1944), Japanese television and radio presenter
Kume Keiichiro (1866–1934), Japanese painter
Kume Kunitake (1839–1931), Japanese historian
Masao Kume (1891–1952), Japanese playwright, novelist and poet
Mike Kume (1926–2012), American baseball player
, Japanese swimmer
Sanshiro Kume (1926–2009), Japanese radiochemist
Tadashi Kume (born 1931), Japanese former president of Honda Motor Co., Ltd.
Takasuke Kume (born 1985), Japanese mixed martial artist
Kume no Wakame (died 780), Japanese muraji

Places
Kume Island, an island, part of the Okinawa Islands
Kume, Okayama, a town located in Kume District, Okayama, Japan
Kume District, Okayama, a district located in Okayama Prefecture, Japan
Kumejima, Okinawa, a town located in Shimajiri District, Okinawa, Japan
Kumemura, a center of Chinese culture located in Naha, Okinawa, Japan
Kumenan, Okayama, a town located in Kume District, Okayama, Japan

Other uses
Kume no Heinai-dō, a small folk shrine located in Asakusa, Tokyo, Japan
Kumeyaay people, Native American people of the extreme southwestern United States and northwest Mexico

Japanese-language surnames